Cult of the dead refers to the veneration of the dead. It may be used to mean:

Anthropology
 Cult of the dead, and the ancient custom of Charon's obol
 Cult of the dead, evidenced by Giant's Ring in Ireland
 Cult of the dead, evidenced by Green week in ancient Slavic culture
 Cult of the dead, evidenced by the Etruscan Tomb of Hunting and Fishing
 Cult of the dead, evidenced in the ancient Rosalia (festival)
 Cult of the dead, in ancient Akrai
 Cult of the dead, in Berber mythology
 Cult of the dead, in Canaanite religion
 Cult of the dead, in Nordic religion
 Cult of the dead, observances evidence in the ancient festival, Feralia
 Cult of the dead, of the Vedda people
 Cult of the dead, reflected in the Greek hero cult
 Cult of the dead, scenes on the Japodian burial urns

Media
 Cult of the Dead, a 2008 album by Legion of the Damned
 Cult of the Dead Cow, a media and hacking group

See also
 Death (disambiguation)